Football manager may refer to:

 Manager (association football) in association football, responsible for running a football club or a national team
Football Manager (1982 series), a series of football management simulation games
 Football Manager, a series of football management simulation games started in 2005
 The online game of the above, Football Manager Live